Kellerville is an unincorporated community in Shelby County, in the U.S. state of Missouri.

Kellerville was founded circa 1906, at the time the railroad was built through the neighborhood. The community bears the name of the local Keller family. Variant names were "Keller Switch" and "Kellers".

References

Unincorporated communities in Shelby County, Missouri
Unincorporated communities in Missouri